"Step It Up" is a song by British hip hop and electronic dance group Stereo MC's, released as the second single from their third album, Connected (1992). It charted higher than the band's earlier single "Connected" and the next single "Ground Level". The single peaked at number 12 on the UK Singles Chart, number 13 in New Zealand, and number 87 in Australia. It appeared in the 1993 comedy film Wayne's World 2 and was also included on the 1996 compilation album The Beautiful Game.

Critical reception
American magazine Billboard described the song as a "lively unity anthem". An editor, Larry Flick, commented, "U.K. funketeers continue to effectively peddle their unique blend of retro-dance, traditional jazz, and hip-hop. Insinuating workout is bolstered by a smokin' trumpet solo and uplifting lyrics. Fans of the previous "Connected" will find this gem irresistible. Actually, this anthemic jam has the juice to win the group a whole new contingent of fans. Get on it". Dave Sholin from the Gavin Report found that their unique mix of musical influences place the Stereo MC's "among the freshest sounds to come along this year." He added, "This uptempo entry contains the magic vibe that's brought them worldwide attention". Andrew Smith from Melody Maker declared it as "ultra-dancey" and "this year's 'Lost In Music'". Blake Baxter from Music Weeks RM Dance Update wrote, "This has a great texture, weaving a mood for realists and sequenced bass fanatics. Hooky vocals and funky drum tracks spiced up with hot horn make this soulful but still unique". Peter Stanton from Smash Hits gave "Step It Up" four out of five, adding, "Thumping basslines, a dash of trumpets and a groove that could get the local old people's home boogeyin' till the dawn". Jonathan Bernstein from Spin remarked that "lacerating hooks abound" on the track, describing it as "nagging".

Track listings
 7-inch vinylA: "Step It Up" (radio edit)
B: "Step It Up" (Ultimatum Trumpet mix)

 UK 12-inch vinylA1: "Step It Up" (extended mix)
A2: "Step It Up" (Ultimatum Trumpet mix)
A3: "Step It Up" (Ultimatum remix)
B1: "Step It Up" (Stereo Field dub)
B2: "Step It Up" (Stereo Field instrumental dub)

 US 12-inch vinyl'
A1: "Step It Up" (Ultimatum remix)
A2: "Step It Up" (Ultimatum Trumpet mix)
B1: "Step It Up" (Stereo Field dub)
B2: "Step It Up" (album version)

Charts

Weekly charts

Year-end charts

References

1992 singles
1992 songs
4th & B'way Records singles
Island Records singles
Stereo MCs songs